The Regional Council of Lorraine was the deliberative assembly of the former French region of Lorraine until December 31, 2015, following the region's incorporation with Champagne-Ardenne and Alsace to form the new Grand Est region.

It has 73 members and sits in the former abbey of Saint-Clément, in the Pontiffroy district of Metz. The Hôtel de Région is one of the many sites occupied by the Regional Council: boulevard de Trèves (recently renovated military buildings), Sainte-Barbe and Blida for Metz (there is also a site in Nancy).

Its last president was Jean-Pierre Masseret (PS), elected on March 28, 2004.

The Regional Council of Lorraine was also a member of the cross-border inter-regional cooperation called Grande Région, or "SaarLorLux".

Presidents of the regional council

Vice-presidents 
The President of the Regional Council is assisted by vice-presidents chosen from among the regional councillors. Each of them has a delegation of authority.

Following the list of vice-presidents of the Council from 2010 to 2015:
 1st Vice-Phairman: Jean-Yves Le Deaut
 2nd Vice-President: Laurence Demonet
 3rd Vice-President: Daniel Beguin
 4th Vice-President: Lovely Chretien
 5th Vice-President: Patrick Abate
 6th Vice-President: Paola Zanetti
 7th Vice-President: Jean-Pierre Liouville
 8th Vice-President: Jacqueline Fontaine
 9th Vice-President: Christian Franqueville
 10th Vice-President: Rachel Thomas
 11th Vice-President: Patrick Hatzig
 12th Vice-President: Josiane Madelaine
 13th Vice-President: Michel Obiegala
 14th Vice-President: Angèle Dufflo
 15th Vice-President: Thibaut Villemin

Composition

References 

Lorraine
Lorraine
Politics of Lorraine
Politics of Grand Est